Bogorodsky (masculine), Bogorodskaya (feminine), or Bogorodskoye (neuter) is the name of several inhabited localities in Russia.

Urban localities
Bogorodskoye, Kirov Oblast, an urban-type settlement in Bogorodsky District of Kirov Oblast
Bogorodskoye, Moscow Oblast, a work settlement in Sergiyevo-Posadsky District of Moscow Oblast

Rural localities
Bogorodsky, Republic of Bashkortostan, a village in Yermekeyevsky District of the Republic of Bashkortostan
Bogorodsky, Udmurt Republic, a village in Alnashsky District of the Udmurt Republic
Bogorodskaya, a village under the jurisdiction of Pervomaysky City District of Kirov, Kirov Oblast
Bogorodskoye, Khabarovsk Krai, a selo in Ulchsky District of Khabarovsk Krai
Bogorodskoye, name of several other rural localities